Scudderia mexicana, the Mexican bush katydid, is a species of phaneropterine katydid in the family Tettigoniidae. They are 30–38 mm in length and have slender wings. Nymphs have a horn between their antennae. They eat leaves, including big-leaf mahogany.

References

Further reading
 
 Capinera J.L, Scott R.D., Walker T.J. (2004). Field Guide to Grasshoppers, Katydids, and Crickets of the United States. Cornell University Press.

Scudderia
Insects described in 1861